Colin Wilson (born October 20, 1989) is an American former professional ice hockey forward. He played eleven seasons in the National Hockey League (NHL) for the Nashville Predators and Colorado Avalanche. He was drafted seventh overall by the Predators in the 2008 NHL Entry Draft.

Prior to joining the NHL, Wilson played for the Boston University Terriers in the Hockey East conference. During his sophomore year, Wilson was named to the First Team All-American and Hockey East First Team.

Playing career

Early career
After initially playing with the U.S. National Development Team Program as a junior, Wilson enrolled to play collegiate hockey with the Boston University Terriers of the Hockey East.

After his freshman year with the Terriers in 2007–08, he was awarded New England's college hockey Rookie of the Year, as well as Hockey East Rookie of the Year. He was selected in the first round, 7th overall, by the Nashville Predators of the National Hockey League (NHL) in the 2008 NHL Entry Draft.

Wilson led the Terriers in points in his sophomore season. He was recognized as one of the best players in NCAA Division I with his election to the Hobey Hat Trick, a group of three players nominated to win the Hobey Baker Memorial Award.  His teammate, Matt Gilroy, eventually won the award. Wilson was named a First Team All–American, Hockey East First Team, Hockey East leading goal scorer and was second in the nation in total points. The Terriers were ranked the #1 team in the nation for much of Wilson's sophomore season and went on to win the National Championship.

Professional

Nashville Predators
 Wilson signed a three-year entry-level contract with Nashville on April 17, 2009, following his sophomore season. Wilson made his NHL debut with the Predators on October 12, 2009.  He scored his first NHL goal on October 21 against Tim Thomas of the Boston Bruins.

Following the 2014–15 NHL season Wilson became a restricted free agent under the NHL Collective Bargaining Agreement. The Nashville Predators made him a qualifying offer to retain his NHL rights, and on July 5, 2015, Wilson filed for Salary Arbitration. He signed a four-year, $15.75 million deal with the Predators on July 27, 2015.

Colorado Avalanche
On July 1, 2017, Wilson was traded by the Predators to the Colorado Avalanche in exchange for a fourth round draft pick in 2019.

Wilson faced his former Nashville teammates in the first round of the 2018 Stanley Cup playoffs. He registered an assist as the Avalanche lost in six games, ending their season.

On July 1, 2019, Wilson agreed to a one-year contract extension with the Avalanche worth $2.6 million.

Retirement
On October 29, 2020, Wilson announced that he would likely not return to professional hockey, citing his problems coping with obsessive–compulsive disorder and the substance abuse pertaining from it, as well as his struggles recovering from hip surgery the previous season. On January 5, 2021, Wilson officially announced his retirement.

International play

Wilson decided to represent Team USA, for whom he had played at the 2008 World Juniors. At the tournament he was tied for the most goals with 6. He was the only roster player never to have played a game in the NHL selected to represent Team USA at the 2009 IIHF World Championships in Bern/Kloten, Switzerland.

Personal life
Wilson is the son of former NHL player Carey Wilson and the grandson of former NHL player Jerry Wilson. He was born in Greenwich, Connecticut while his father played for the New York Rangers, but he was raised in Winnipeg, Manitoba.

Career statistics

Regular season and playoffs

International

Awards and honors

References

External links
 

1989 births
American men's ice hockey centers
Boston University Terriers men's ice hockey players
Colorado Avalanche players
Ice hockey players from Connecticut
Living people
Milwaukee Admirals players
Nashville Predators draft picks
Nashville Predators players
National Hockey League first-round draft picks
Sportspeople from Greenwich, Connecticut
AHCA Division I men's ice hockey All-Americans